Nokia 900 may refer to:

 Nokia Lumia 900, a Windows Phone 7-powered smartphone
 Nokia N900, an Internet tablet